All railway stations in Italian Somaliland were served by the Mogadishu–Villabruzzi Railway of .

Railway stations

Characteristics

The Railway stations in Somalia, with the exception of the one of the capital Mogadiscio, were very simple and often were simple wood structures without passenger services. Some structures of the Mogadiscio station were dismantled by the British during World War II and sent to India.

The railway of Somalia italiana connected the capital city Mogadishu with Afgooye, and subsequently—after 1929—with Villaggio Duca degli Abruzzi, typically called Villabruzzi (present-day Jowhar). The line in the early 1930s was served mainly by FIAT-TIBB diesel machines. The line and the stations were built by the Italians but were later dismantled by British troops during World War II.

In 1928-1936, the track was initially built in sections until Buloburde. The first railway section was 130 km long. It started in the small railway station of Bivio Adalei of the Mogadishu-Villaggio Duca degli Abruzzi (Jowhar) railway.

In 1940, the construction of a larger and more modern railway station in Mogadishu (similar to the one in Addis Ababa) was proposed, but the beginning of World War II blocked it.

Notes

See also
 Railway stations in Sudan
 Railway stations in Ethiopia
 Railway stations in Eritrea
 Railway stations in Kenya

Bibliography
 Hess, L. Italian colonialism in Somalia. University of Chicago Press. Chicago, 1966
 Marra, A. Trasporti e comunicazioni dell'Impero Unione editoriale d'Italia. Roma, 1940

Rail transport in Somalia